Angot Point is a headland which marks the south tip of Hoseason Island, in the Palmer Archipelago. It was named by the French Antarctic Expedition under Jean-Baptiste Charcot, 1903–05, for Alfred Angot, Assistant Director of the French Meteorological Service and a member of the commission which published the scientific results of the expedition.

References
 

Headlands of the Palmer Archipelago